Owen Palmer Robertson (born August 31, 1937 in Jackson, Mississippi) is an American Christian theologian and biblical scholar. He taught at Reformed Theological Seminary, Westminster Theological Seminary, Covenant Theological Seminary, Knox Theological Seminary as well as at the African Bible Colleges of Malawi and Uganda. He also served as principal of the latter institution. Robertson was the first elected male SGA president of Belhaven College (now Belhaven University) in 1957.

Robertson is perhaps best known for his book The Christ of the Covenants.  His definition of a biblical covenant being "a bond in blood, sovereignly administered" has been widely discussed.

Robertson lives in Winston Salem, North Carolina with his wife, Joanna, where he is writing and working as head of Consummation Ministries. 

In 2008, a Festschrift was published in his honor. The Hope Fulfilled: Essays in Honor of O. Palmer Robertson included contributions by Bruce Waltke, Richard Gaffin, George W. Knight III, Simon J. Kistemaker, Robert L. Reymond, and Morton H. Smith.

References

Living people
American Calvinist and Reformed theologians
Westminster Theological Seminary faculty
Covenant Theological Seminary faculty
Westminster Theological Seminary alumni
Union Presbyterian Seminary alumni
1937 births
People from Jackson, Mississippi
20th-century Calvinist and Reformed theologians
21st-century Calvinist and Reformed theologians
American biblical scholars
American expatriates in Uganda
Vice-chancellors of universities in Uganda